Dunesh Harsha Gankanda is a Sri Lankan politician and a member of the Parliament of Sri Lanka (born 16 March 1972).

References
 

Living people
United National Party politicians
Members of the 13th Parliament of Sri Lanka
Members of the 14th Parliament of Sri Lanka
Members of the 15th Parliament of Sri Lanka
Deputy ministers of Sri Lanka
1972 births